Kurath is a surname. People with the surname include:

 Gertrude Prokosch Kurath (1903–1992), American dancer
 Hans Kurath (1891–1992), American linguist

References